Miquel Asins Arbó (21 January 1916 – 26 October 1996) was a Spanish composer. He composed in a variety of genres but is particularly known for his popular songs in the Valencian music tradition and for the more than 70 sound tracks which he composed for Spanish films and television.

Asins Arbó was born in Barcelona but when he was a child moved with his family to Valencia where he studied composition at the Conservatory of Valencia under Manuel Palau. He served as the bandmaster of military regiments in Valencia and Madrid in 1944. In 1976 he was appointed to the chair of accompaniment at the Madrid Royal Conservatory, a post which he held until 1985. He died in at the age of 79 in Valencia where the Plaza Miguel Asins Arbó is named in his honour.

Awards
 Premio Nacional de Música (1950)
 Premi Ciutat de Barcelona (1954)
 Premio SGAE (1990)
 Member of the Real Academia de Bellas Artes de San Carlos de Valencia (1980)

References

 José Miguel Sanz García: "La obra del compositor Miguel asíns Arbó: hacia una catalogación definitiva de su obra", en Nasarre, Revista Aragonesa de Musicología, nº XX (2004), pp. 431-597.
 José Miguel Sanz García: Miguel Asíns Arbó: Música y cinematografía. Análisis musico-visual de sus composiciones en la filmografía de Luis García Berlanga. Valencia, Universitat de València (Tesis Doctoral), 2008.
 José Miguel Sanz García: Miguel Asíns Arbó y su música para banda sinfónica. Valencia, Tot per l´aire, 2009.

External links 
 

Composers from Catalonia
1916 births
1996 deaths
20th-century composers
20th-century Spanish musicians